Moses is a surname derived from the Biblical Moses. It can be of either Jewish, Welsh, or English origin.  The Hebrew form of the name, Moshe, is probably of Egyptian origin, from a short form of any of various ancient Egyptian personal names, such as Ramesses and Tutmose, meaning "conceived by (a certain god)".  However, very early in its history it acquired a folk etymology, being taken as a derivative of the Hebrew root verb mšh, "to draw (something from the water", a reference to the story of the infant Moses being discovered among the bulrushes by Pharaoh's daughter (Exodus 2:1-10).  As a Welsh family name, it was adopted among Dissenter families in the eighteenth and nineteenth centuries.  As a North American family name, it has been an anglicization of foreign forms of the name, such as Moise, Moshe, or Mozes.

People with this name

 A. Dirk Moses (b. 1967), Australian historian
 Albert Moses (1937–2017), Sri Lankan-born British actor
 Alfred Moses (politician) (1977–2022), Canadian politician
 Alfred H. Moses (b. 1929),  American attorney and diplomat
 Alfred Huger Moses (1840–1918), American banker and investor
 Anna Mary Robertson Moses (1860–1961), "Grandma Moses", American folk artist and painter
 Anthony John Moses (b. 1942), Welsh scientist
 Bob Moses (activist) (1935–2021), American civil rights activist
 Bob Moses (musician) (b. 1948), American jazz drummer
 Bob Moses (rugby league) (1940–2017), Australian rugby league footballer
 Brian Moses (b. 1950), English poet
 Burke Moses (b. 1959), American actor
 Carl E. Moses (1929–2014), American businessman and politician from Alaska
 Charles Moses (1900–1988), English head of the Australian Broadcasting Corporation
 Charles Moses (athlete) (b. 1954), Ghanaian sprinter
 Charles L. Moses (1856–1910), American politician
 Dan Mozes (b. 1983), American football player
 Daniel David Moses (1952–2020), Canadian poet
 David Moses (–1999), Welsh rugby union, and rugby league footballer who played in the 1940s, 1950s and 1960s
 David Lokonga Moses (contemporary), Sudanese politician, governor of Yei River State, South Sudan
 Dylan Moses (born 1998), American football player
 Ed Moses (artist) (1926–2018), American artist
 Ed Moses (physicist) (contemporary), American physicist
 Ed Moses (swimmer) (b. 1980), American swimmer
 Edwin Moses (b. 1955), American track and field athlete
 Franklin J. Moses Jr. (1838–1906), American politician
 Franklin J. Moses Sr. (1804–1877), American attorney, planter, politician, and judge
 George H. Moses (1869–1944), American diplomat
 Glyn Moses (1928–2021), Welsh rugby union, and rugby league footballer who played in the 1940s and 1950s
 Hagin ben Moses (fl. 1255–1290), English rabbi
 Harry Moses (1858–1938), Australian cricketer
 Haven Moses (b. 1946), American football player
 Helen Moses (1905–1985), American swimmer
 Henry Moses (engraver) (1781–1870), English engraver
 Henry Moses (politician) (1832–1926), Australian politician
 Henry C. Moses (1941–2008), American educator
 Ingrid Moses (b. 1941), Australian academic
 Itamar Moses (b. 1977), American author
 J. C. Moses (1936–1977), jazz drummer
 J. J. Moses (b. 1979), American football player
 Janice Moses, Trinidadian cricketer
 Jimmy Moses (b. 1965), Indian actor, playback singer, stand-up comedian, and mimicry artist
 Joel Moses (1941–2022), Israeli-American computer scientist
 John Moses (Norwegian politician) (1781–1849), member of the Norwegian Constituent Assembly
 John Moses (Illinois politician) (1825–1898), Illinois judge and politician
 John Moses (American politician) (1885–1945), governor of North Dakota
 John Moses (baseball) (b. 1957), American baseball player
 John Moses (priest) (born 1938), English clergyman
 John A. Moses (b. 1930), Australian historian, history educator, and Anglican priest
 Kareem Moses (b. 1990), Trinidadian footballer
 Louie Moses, US businessman
 Mark Moses (b. 1958), American actor
 Merrill Moses (b. 1977), American Olympic water polo player
 Miriam Moses (1884–1965), British politician
 Mitchell Moses (b. 1994), Australian-born Lebanese international rugby league footballer
 Noah Mozes (1912–86), Israeli newspaper publisher and managing editor 
 Pablo Moses (b. 1948), Jamaican singer
 Paulus Moses (b. 1978), Namibian boxer
 Quentin Moses (b. 1983), American football player
 Raphael J. Moses (1812–1893), American lawyer, plantation owner, Confederate officer, and politician
 Remi Moses (b. 1960), British footballer
 Rick Moses (b. 1952), American actor and singer/songwriter
 Robert Moses (1888–1981), city planner for New York City
 Senta Moses (b. 1973), American actress
 Shelia P. Moses, American author
 Ted Moses (b. 1950), Canadian politician
 Teedra Moses, American R&B singer and songwriter
 Victor Moses (b. 1990), Nigerian born English footballer
 Wally Moses (1910–1990), American baseball player
 William R. Moses (b. 1959), American actor
 Wilson Jeremiah Moses (b. 1942), American historian
 Winfield Moses (b. 1943), American politician
 Yolanda T. Moses (b. 1946), anthropologist and college administrator

Arts and Entertainment
Bob Moses (band), Canadian electronic music duo

See also
 Moses (given name)
 Moses (disambiguation)
 Moise (disambiguation)

References

Bibliography
Hanks, Patrick, Dictionary of American Family Names (2003), Oxford University Press, 
Hanks, Patrick and Flavia Hodges, Oxford Dictionary of Names, (1988), Oxford University Press, 

Jewish surnames

de:Moses